The Basketball Champions League rankings are the competition's criteria for ordering teams and leagues according to their performance with the aim to give an objective process for determining the participation of clubs each season.

Ranking calculation
The clubs receive 2 points for a win and no points for a defeat from the regular season and the following stages. Bonus points are added to the number of points scored in a season. Since the 2020–21 season, 3 points were awarded instead of 2 points for a regular season win due to the COVID-19 pandemic and the change of competition format.

Bonus points are allocated for:
Clubs that are eliminated in the qualifying rounds (1 bonus point for the first round, 2 for the second round and 4 for the third round if it is played)
Clubs that qualify for the regular season of the Champions League (5 bonus points).
Clubs that qualify for the round of 16 of the Champions League (5 bonus points). Since the 2021–22 season, only the 8 group winners.
Clubs that qualify for the quarterfinals of the Champions League (3 bonus points).
Clubs that qualify for the Final Four of the Champions League (4 bonus points and 1 additional point if finishes third, 2 if second and 4 if it wins the competition).

Country coefficient
The country coefficient is used to rank the basketball leagues of Europe, and thus determine the maximum number of clubs from an association that will participate in the Basketball Champions League. This coefficient is determined by the results of the clubs of the leagues in the Basketball Champions League games over the past three seasons. The number of points awarded each season is divided by the number of clubs that participated for that association in that season. This number is then rounded up to one decimal place (e.g. 2⅔ would be rounded to 2.7).

Current ranking
The ranking below takes into account of each league's performance in European competitions from 2019–20 to 2021–22, with the 2021–22 season currently taking place.

As of September 2022 the ranking is as follows:

NR No rank (league did not enter in any of the seasons used for computing coefficients)

Top leagues by period
The following data indicates the three top-ranked leagues in each three-year period.

The table shows the ranking of nations with respect to the total number of years in the top three of the rankings:

Club ranking
The club coefficient is either the sum of the points earned by the club in the Basketball Champions League over the previous three seasons. This ranking is used by the BCL to determine a club's seeding in club competition draws.

Current ranking
The top 25 clubs as of June 2022 are as follows:

Top club by period
The following data indicate the top-ranked clubs in each 3-year period.

Top-rated clubs listed by number of times they were top-ranked over a 3-year period:

References

External links
Official website

Basketball Champions League
Basketball rankings